The Cecil D. Andrus–White Clouds Wilderness is a  protected area in the western United States, located in Custer County, Idaho. The Sawtooth National Recreation Area, in the Sawtooth National Forest, manages the majority of the wilderness, with  managed by the Bureau of Land Management at the wilderness's eastern edge along the East Fork Salmon River. The wilderness encompasses part of the White Cloud Mountains and is north of the Hemingway–Boulders Wilderness and west of the Jim McClure–Jerry Peak Wilderness.

The area, originally White Clouds Wilderness, was added to the National Wilderness Preservation System in 2015 on August 7, with the passage of the Sawtooth National Recreation Area and Jerry Peak Wilderness Additions Act. Sponsored by second district representative Mike Simpson, a Republican from Blackfoot, it passed Congress without objection and was signed into law by President Barack Obama.

In 2018 it was renamed to honor the late Idaho Governor Cecil Andrus, over the opposition of Senator Jim Risch.

See also
List of lakes of the White Cloud Mountains
Sawtooth National Recreation Area
White Cloud Mountains

References

Sawtooth National Forest
Protected areas established in 2015
Protected areas of Custer County, Idaho
Wilderness areas of Idaho
Bureau of Land Management areas in Idaho
2015 establishments in Idaho